Giuseppe Pinto (born 26 May 1952) is an Italian prelate of the Catholic Church who worked in the diplomatic service of the Holy See. He served as an Apostolic Nuncio from 2001 until his retirement in 2020. He joined the diplomatic service of the Holy See in 1984.

Biography
Giuseppe Pinto was born in Noci, Italy, on 26 May 1952. 

To prepare for a diplomatic career he entered the Pontifical Ecclesiastical Academy in 1980. He joined the diplomatic service of the Holy See on 1 May 1984.

On 4 December 2001, Pope John Paul II appointed him Apostolic Delegate to Mauritania and Apostolic Nuncio to Senegal, at the same time naming him titular archbishop of Anglona. On 5 February 2002, he was also appointed Apostolic Nuncio to Cape Verde and Mali. On 5 March he was appointed Nuncio to Guinea-Bissau.

Pope Benedict XVI appointed him Apostolic Nuncio to Chile on 6 December 2007.

On 10 May 2011, he was appointed Apostolic Nuncio to the Philippines.

On 1 July 2017, Pope Francis appointed him as Apostolic Nuncio to Croatia.

In 2018, a lawsuit against the Archdiocese of Santiago made public an email message written to Pinto in 2009 by Archbishop Francisco Javier Errázuriz, in which Errázuriz admitted to Pinto that had not followed the proper procedures for handling allegations of sexual abuse against Fernando Karadima, a priest at the centre of the sex abuse crisis in Chile.

He was replaced in Croatia in 2019, and Pope Francis accepted his resignation as nuncio on 31 July 2020.

See also
 List of heads of the diplomatic missions of the Holy See

References

1952 births
Living people
Pontifical Ecclesiastical Academy alumni
Apostolic Nuncios to Croatia
Apostolic Nuncios to Senegal
Apostolic Nuncios to Mauritania
Apostolic Nuncios to Cape Verde
Apostolic Nuncios to Mali
Apostolic Nuncios to Chile
Apostolic Nuncios to Guinea-Bissau
Apostolic Nuncios to the Philippines